The Kangda Police Stadium is a cricket ground in Dharamsala, Himachal Pradesh, India.  The ground first held a first-class match in 1990 when Himachal Pradesh played Haryana in the 1990/91 Ranji Trophy.  The following season a further first-class match was held when Himachal Pradesh played the Services in the 1991/92 Ranji Trophy.  No further major matches have been staged there.

References

External links
Kangda Police Stadium at ESPNcricinfo
Kangda Police Stadium at CricketArchive

Cricket grounds in Himachal Pradesh
Defunct cricket grounds in India
Buildings and structures in Dharamshala
1990 establishments in Himachal Pradesh
Sports venues completed in 1990
20th-century architecture in India